Dewey Edgar Williams (February 5, 1916 – March 19, 2000) nicknamed "Dee", was an American professional baseball player.

Williams was a native of Durham, North Carolina. His professional career lasted for 18 seasons, however (1937–54). In June 1944, he was acquired by the Cubs after he batted .313 in 48 games for the Toronto Maple Leafs of the top-level International League. During his rookie 1944 campaign, Williams appeared in an MLB-career-high 79 games (77 as a catcher), and batted .240 with 27 runs batted in.

In , the following season, Williams was the Cubbies' third-string catcher (behind Mickey Livingston and Paul Gillespie); nevertheless, he appeared in 59 games and slugged two of his three career MLB home runs that season. He remained on the Cub roster for the 1945 World Series, and played in two games. As a pinch hitter in Game 5, Williams struck out against Detroit Tigers' ace left-hander Hal Newhouser.  He was a defensive replacement in Game 6, catching the last three innings, grounding out in his only at bat (against Dizzy Trout), and handling two chances without an error. The Cubs split the two games in which Williams played, but the Tigers prevailed in seven games to win the 1945 world championship.

References

External links
, or Retrosheet, or SABR Biography Project, or Venezuelan Winter League statistics

1916 births
2000 deaths
American expatriate baseball players in Canada
Atlanta Crackers players
Baseball players from North Carolina
Brandon Greys players
Chicago Cubs players
Cincinnati Reds players
Durham Bulls players
Elmira Pioneers players
Los Angeles Angels (minor league) players
Macon Peaches players
Major League Baseball catchers
Memphis Chickasaws players
Milwaukee Brewers (minor league) players
Minot Mallards players
Patriotas de Venezuela players
Rochester Red Wings players
Seattle Rainiers players
Sportspeople from Durham, North Carolina
Toledo Sox players
Toronto Maple Leafs (International League) players
Tulsa Oilers (baseball) players
Williamsport Grays players
Williston Oilers players